Anders Olov Bååth Sjöblom (born 13 April 1991) is a retired Swedish footballer who played as a midfielder and current football manager.

Career

Coaching career
While still playing, Bååth began his coaching career at his former club IF Brommapojkarna, where he worked in the youth sector for three years.

In December 2021 it was confirmed, that Bååth had been hired as manager of Österlen FF. During the season, Bååth also made a few appearances for the team. In mid October 2022 it was revealed, that Bååth had left the position.

References

External links
Anders Bååth at SvFF (in Swedish)

Anders Bååth at Fotbolltransfers.com

1991 births
Living people
Association football midfielders
IF Brommapojkarna players
Syrianska FC players
Allsvenskan players
Superettan players
Swedish footballers
Sweden youth international footballers
Gröndals IK players
Seinäjoen Jalkapallokerho players
Gefle IF players
Swedish football managers